Kindersley—Lloydminster was a federal electoral district in Saskatchewan, Canada, 
that was represented in the House of Commons of Canada from 1979 to 1997. This riding was created in 1976 from parts of Battleford—Kindersley, Moose Jaw, Saskatoon—Biggar and Swift Current—Maple Creek ridings.

It was abolished in 1996 when it was redistributed into Battlefords—Lloydminster, Cypress Hills—Grasslands, Saskatoon—Rosetown and Wanuskewin ridings.

Election results

See also 

 List of Canadian federal electoral districts
 Past Canadian electoral districts

External links 
 

Former federal electoral districts of Saskatchewan